Homage to Paderewski is an album of piano pieces by 17 composers, published in 1942 in honour of the Polish pianist, composer and statesman Ignacy Jan Paderewski.

Background
Homage to Paderewski was commissioned by the music publisher Boosey & Hawkes in 1941 in celebration of the 50th anniversary of Paderewski's American debut in 1891. It was Zygmunt Stojowski who initiated the venture. He encouraged some composer friends of Paderewski's to write miniatures for the anniversary. However, Paderewski died on 29 June 1941, before the project was completed, and so the album, on its publication in 1942, became a posthumous tribute to his life and work.

Twenty-one composers submitted 22 works, and 17 were chosen for publication. Of these 17 composers, only three were native-born Americans.  The remainder had either settled in North America or were working there temporarily (Benjamin Britten and Eugene Goossens were in the United States; Arthur Benjamin was in Canada).

Britten misunderstood the commission and wrote a piece for two pianos.  It was published separately but is still considered a part of the overall homage. Béla Bartók did not write a new piece but provided a short suite of three pieces written in 1914–18. Jaromír Weinberger's contribution also seems to have been composed earlier, in 1924. Ernest Schelling, a student of Paderewski, had died in 1939, but his widow submitted a late untitled composition, in the belief that he would have wanted to be involved.

The pieces are all short, none taking more than four minutes to play and some just over one minute.

The premiere recording of the complete work was made in 2011 by Jonathan Plowright, with Aaron Shorr in the Britten piece.

The music

References

Sources
 Hyperion Records
 Music Web International: Recording of the Month
 Homage to Paderewski at Boosey & Hawkes

Composer tributes (classical music)
Compositions for solo piano
Suites (music)
1941 compositions
1918 compositions
Collaborations in classical music
Compositions by Béla Bartók
Compositions by Arthur Benjamin
Compositions by Benjamin Britten
Compositions by Mario Castelnuovo-Tedesco
Compositions by Bohuslav Martinů
Compositions by Darius Milhaud
Compositions by Vittorio Rieti
Compositions by Zygmunt Stojowski
Compositions by Jaromír Weinberger